The Art of the Improvisers is an album credited to jazz composer and saxophonist Ornette Coleman, released by Atlantic Records in 1970. The album was assembled without Coleman's input, comprising outtakes from recording sessions of 1959 to 1961 for The Shape of Jazz to Come, Change of the Century, This Is Our Music, Ornette!, and Ornette on Tenor. Recording sessions in 1959 took place at Radio Recorders in Hollywood, California; those in 1960 and 1961 at Atlantic Studios in New York City.

Reception
Thom Jurek, writing in Allmusic, characterized the album as "basically one of Coleman's most uptempo records for Atlantic, but also one of his most soulful. It deserves serious re-evaluation".

Track listing
All compositions by Ornette Coleman.

Side one

Side two

Personnel
 Ornette Coleman — alto saxophone;  tenor saxophone on "Harlem's Manhattan"
 Don Cherry — pocket trumpet; cornet on "Just for You"
 Charlie Haden — bass on 1959 and 1960 tracks
 Scott LaFaro — bass on "The Alchemy of Scott LaFaro"
 Jimmy Garrison — bass on "Harlem's Manhattan"
 Billy Higgins — drums on 1959 tracks
 Ed Blackwell — drums on 1960 and 1961 tracks

References

1970 albums
Ornette Coleman albums
Atlantic Records albums
Albums produced by Nesuhi Ertegun